Frank Henderson (born December 14, 1931) is an American professional poker player. He currently resides in Houston, Texas.

Henderson was the runner-up to Johnny Chan in the 1987 World Series of Poker (WSOP) $10,000 no limit hold'em Main Event for $250,000. He also finished in the money of the same event in 1996.

Henderson has made final tables in numerous other WSOP events, including Omaha, Draw, Razz and Seven-Card Stud. He won a WSOP bracelet in the 1989 Pot Limit Omaha event, where he defeated a final table that included Jay Heimowitz, Hoyt Corkins, Phil Hellmuth Jr., and T. J. Cloutier.

As of 2010, his total live tournament winnings exceed $1,500,000. His 36 cashes at the WSOP account for $825,076 of those winnings.

References

External links
 Hendon Mob tournament results

American poker players
World Series of Poker bracelet winners
1931 births
Living people